This is a list of the major honours won by football clubs in Iraq. It lists every Iraqi association football club to have won any of the major domestic trophies at a national level or major continental trophies.

Key
Domestic competitions
IPL = Iraqi Premier League
IFD = Iraqi National First Division (defunct in 1974)
FAC = Iraq FA Cup
EC = Iraqi Elite Cup (defunct in 2004)
SC = Iraqi Super Cup
Continental competitions
AFC =  AFC Cup
ACC =  Arab Club Champions Cup

Honours table
Correct as of 2 October 2022
Clubs in bold have won two or more of the above-mentioned trophies in the same season at least once; clubs tied in total honours are listed chronologically in reverse by last win

References

External links
Iraqi Football Website

Football in Iraq